Malmidea is a genus of crustose lichens and the type genus of the family Malmideaceae. It was established in 2011 to contain a phylogenetically distinct group of species formerly placed in the genus Malcolmiella. Malmidea comprises more than 50 mostly tropical species that grow on bark, although a few grow on leaves.

Taxonomy
Both the family Malmideaceae and the genus Malmidea were created in 2011 to accommodate a group of species, formerly placed in genus Malcolmiella (family Pilocarpaceae), that molecular phylogenetics showed to be a distinct lineage and worthy of recognition at the family level. Klaus Kalb, Eimy Rivas Plata, and H. Thorsten Lumbsch originally placed 37 species in the genus – 5 new species and 32 new combinations. Many additional species have since been transferred to Malmidea from other genera, or described as new.

The generic name Malmidea honours Swedish botanist Gustaf Oskar Andersson Malme (1864–1937).

Description
The thallus of Malmidea lichens grow on bark (corticolous) or on leaves (foliicolous). The form of the thallus is like a crust, ranging in surface texture from smooth to verrucose (studded with wartlike protuberances), granulose (covered with small grains) or pustulate (covered with pustules). These variously shaped surface bumps are often formed by goniocysts (spherical aggregations of photobiont cells surrounded by short-celled hyphae) that develop on a whitish fibrous underlying prothallus. The photobiont partner of Malmidea is a member of Chlorococcaceae, a family of green algae.

Malmidea apothecia are sessile, with a more or less rounded shape, and have a distinct margin. They have a biatorine structure, meaning that they have only a pale, not blackened proper margin and always lack a margin on the thallus. The excipulum is usually paraplectenchymatous (a cell arrangement where the hyphae are oriented in all directions), made of radiating hyphae, partly with medullary layer or chambers composed of loosely arranged, periclinal hyphae (i.e. lined up in parallel adjacent to another layer of hyphae) with constricted septa and incrusted with hydrophobic granules. The hypothecium (the layer of hyphal tissue immediately beneath the hymenium) is prosoplectenchymatous (a cell arrangement where the hyphae are all oriented in one direction), and translucent to dark brown.  Asci are club-shaped, lacking a distinct tubular structure in the tholus that is characteristic of family Pilocarpaceae. Ascospores usually number 4 to 8 per ascus, and are colourless, ellipsoid, non-septate, and usually filled with oblong crystals. The spore walls are evenly thickened or thickened at the ends, and halonate (having a transparent outer layer). Conidia are threadlike and curved, measuring 17–25 by 0.8 μm.

Secondary chemicals associated with Malmidea include atranorin, sometimes norsolorinic acid (as in M. piperis), anthraquinones, biphenyls and many unknown xantholepinones.

Species

, Malmidea contains an estimated 52 species, although more are expected to be transferred into the genus from tropical species of Lecidea. Malmidea mostly occurs in tropical rainforests. Eleven new Malmidea species were reported from Brazil and Venezuela in 2021.

Malmidea albomarginata  – Venezuela
Malmidea allobakeri  – Brazil
Malmidea allopapillosa  – Venezuela
Malmidea amazonica 
Malmidea atlantica 
Malmidea atlanticoides  – Brazil
Malmidea attenboroughii  – Bolivia
Malmidea aurigera 
Malmidea bacidinoides 
Malmidea badimioides 
Malmidea bakeri  – Asia
Malmidea ceylanica 
Malmidea chrysostigma  – Asia
Malmidea cineracea  – Nicaragua
Malmidea cinereonigrella 
Malmidea coralliformis  – Thailand
Malmidea corallophora  – Philippines
Malmidea duplomarginata 
Malmidea eeuuae  – Thailand
Malmidea fellhaneroides 
Malmidea fenicis 
Malmidea flavopustulosa 
Malmidea floridensis  – 
Malmidea fulva 
Malmidea furfurosa 
Malmidea fuscella 
Malmidea granifera 
Malmidea gyalectoides 
Malmidea gymnopiperis 
Malmidea hechicerae  – Venezuela
Malmidea hernandeziana  – Venezuela
Malmidea hypomelaena 
Malmidea incrassata  – Brazil
Malmidea indica 
Malmidea inflata  – Thailand
Malmidea isidiifera  – Brazil; Venezuela
Malmidea leptoloma 
Malmidea leucogranifera 
Malmidea leucopiperis  – Brazil; Venezuela
Malmidea nigromarginata  – Nicaragua
Malmidea pallidoatlantica  – Brazil
Malmidea papillosa  – Sri Lanka
Malmidea perisidiata 
Malmidea perplexa  – Brazil; Thailand
Malmidea piae  – Thailand
Malmidea piperina 
Malmidea piperis 
Malmidea plicata  – Sri Lanka
Malmidea polisensis 
Malmidea polycampia 
Malmidea psychotrioides 
Malmidea reunionis  – Réunion
Malmidea rhodopsis 
Malmidea rhodopisoides  – Brazil
Malmidea sanguineostigma  – Sri Lanka
Malmidea sorsogona 
Malmidea subaurigera  – Asia
Malmidea subcinerea  – Venezuela
Malmidea subgranifera 
Malmidea sulphureosorediata  – Brazil
Malmidea taytayensis 
Malmidea trailiana 
Malmidea tratiana  – Thailand
Malmidea variabilis  – Thailand
Malmidea vinosa 
Malmidea volcaniana  – Brazil; Venezuela

References

Malmideaceae
Lichen genera
Lecanorales genera
Taxa described in 2011
Taxa named by Helge Thorsten Lumbsch
Taxa named by Klaus Kalb